Events in the year 1977 in Norway.

Incumbents
 Monarch – Olav V
 Prime Minister – Odvar Nordli (Labour Party)

Events

 12 September – The 1977 Parliamentary election takes place.
 22 April – Ekofisk oil field blowout: an oil well blowout occurred at the Ekofisk Bravo platform, due to an incorrectly installed downhole safety valve. At an estimated  total, this is the largest blowout in the North Sea.

Popular culture

Sports

Music

Film

Literature

Notable births

 

17 January – Sverre Rotevatn, Nordic combined skier.
25 February – Ingrid Sternhoff, footballer.
7 March – Pål Grotnes, ice hockey player.
7 March – Mia Hundvin, handball player.
15 March – Anita Tomulevski, gymnast.
22 March – Linda Ørmen, footballer.
30 March – Silvia K. Kosmo, politician.
19 April – Kristin Bekkevold, footballer.
22 April – Linn Torp, cyclist.
2 May – Pernille Holmboe, model
5 May – Silje Jørgensen, footballer.
18 May – Bjarne Solbakken, alpine skier.
2 June – Alexandra Beverfjord, crime fiction writer, journalist and newspaper editor.
6 June – Trude Gundersen, taekwondo athlete.
30 June – Zahid Ali, stand-up comedian
30 June – Kjersti Horn, theater director.
24 July – Anita Rapp, footballer.
16 August – Sigmund Løvåsen, novelist and playwright.
20 August – Henning Stensrud, ski jumper.
26 August – Linda Cathrine Hofstad Helleland, politician.
6 September – Mari Skurdal, journalist and newspaper editor.
12 September – Pia Tjelta, actress.
30 September – Audun Lysbakken, politician.
7 October – Vegard Arnhoff, sailor.
23 October – Jarle Andhøy, adventurer and sailboat-skipper
12 November  – Anne Molin Kongsgård, snowboarder.
21 November – Annie, pop artist and DJ
3 December – Jennie Johnsen, politician
25 December – Sylvi Listhaug, politician.
28 December – Olaug Nilssen, writer.

Notable deaths
17 January – Erling Fredriksfryd, politician (b.1905)
1 February – Edvard Hambro, politician and 25th President of the United Nations General Assembly (b.1911)
8 February – Eivind Groven, composer and music-theorist (b.1901)
3 March – Kai Knudsen, politician (b.1903)
7 March – Jørgen Leonard Firing, politician (b.1894)
22 March – Alfred Nilsen, politician (b.1892)
27 May – Kristian Birger Gundersen, politician (b.1907)
6 June – Olaf Fredrik Watnebryn, politician (b.1908)
13 June – Olav Aslakson Versto, politician (b.1892)
23 June – Asbjørn Solberg, politician (b.1893)
1 July – Torvald Kvinlaug, politician (b.1911)
2 July – Christian Schweigaard Stang, linguistics researcher and professor (b.1900)
7 July – Nils Kristian Lysø, politician and Minister (b.1905)
13 July – Edgar Christensen, boxer (b.1905)
14 July – Birger Bergersen, politician and minister (b.1891)
24 July – Sigrid Sundby, speed skater (b.1942)
2 August – Alfred Sigurd Nilsen, politician (b.1891)
5 August – Gunvor Galtung Haavik, interpreter charged with espionage (b.1912)
17 August – Harald Økern, Nordic combined skier (b.1898)
2 October – Odd Frantzen, soccer player and Olympic bronze medallist (b.1913)
18 October – Kristian Hauger, pianist, orchestra leader and composer (b. 1905).
4 November – Frede Castberg, jurist (b.1893)
4 November – Sigurd Lund Hamran, politician (b.1902)
5 November – Gunnar Nordbye, United States federal judge (b.1888)
15 November – Olaf Johannessen, rifle shooter (b.1890)
24 November – Reidar Dahl, jurist and sports official, president of the Football Association of Norway (born 1893).
5 December – Jon Mårdalen, cross country skier (b.1895)
25 December – Harald Strøm, speed skater and World Champion (b.1897)

Full date missing
Reidar Eriksen, trade unionist and politician (b.1894)
Lars Fletre, sculptor (b.1904)
John Gunnarsson Helland, Hardanger fiddle maker (b.1897)
Kåre Jonsborg, painter and textile artist (b.1912)
Finn Nagell, military officer, Milorg pioneer, economist and businessperson (born 1899).
 Ola Solberg, newspaper editor and politician (b. 1886)

See also

References

External links